Vaskë Ruko (born 15 July 1977) is an Albanian retired  footballer who played for Apolonia Fier, Këlcyra and Albpetrol Patos.

References

1977 births
Living people
Sportspeople from Fier
Association football forwards
Albanian footballers
KF Apolonia Fier players
KF Këlcyra players
KS Albpetrol Patos players
Kategoria Superiore players
Kategoria e Parë players